Slotoxin is a peptide from Centruroides noxius Hoffmann scorpion venom. It belongs to the short scorpion toxin superfamily.

Method of isolation 
For isolation of slotoxin, scorpions of the species Centruroides noxius are milked for venom in the laboratory. The crude venom is being dissolved in distilled water and spun. The supernatant is separated. The active fraction is then further separated.

Structure 
The 37 amino acid peptide belongs to the charybdotoxin sub-family (αKTx1) and was numbered member 11. αKTx1.11 revealed specificity for mammalian MaxiK channels (hSlo), thus, was named slotoxin. Its sequence is H-Thr-Phe-Ile-Asp-Val-Asp-Cys(1)-Thr-Val-Ser-Lys-Glu-Cys(2)-Trp-Ala-Pro-Cys(3)-Lys-Ala-Ala-Phe-Gly-Val-Asp-Arg-Gly-Lys-Cys(1)-Met-Gly-Lys-Lys-Cys(2)-Lys-Cys(3)-Tyr-Val-OH.

Targets 
Slotoxin reversibly blocks the high conductance calcium-activated potassium channels composed of only α-subunits (Kd = 1.5 nM). Unreversibly blocks the high conductance calcium-activated potassium channels composed of α- and β1-subunits. Unreversibly and weakly blocks the high conductance calcium-activated potassium channels composed of α- and β4-subunits. It shows no activity on other potassium channels.

Mode of action 
The positively charged surface (C-terminal) of SloTx has a specific short-range interaction with the negatively charged pore region of potassium-channels leading to channel blockade. Specific hydrophobic residue-residue interactions between SloTx and MaxiK channels may also contribute to toxin-channel interaction. Another region in the potassium channel (flanking the N-terminal of SloTx) is situated in the face opposite to the site of toxin-pore interaction, and might have implications for the modulation of channel blockade by the MaxiK β subunits.
SloTx is suggested to interact with the MaxiK channel pore-forming α-subunit
by blocking the pore via a bimolecular reaction.

Toxicity 
The large-conductance voltage and calcium-activated potassium (MaxiK, BK) channels are intrinsic membrane proteins that regulate excitability in a large variety of tissues including brain and smooth muscle.

References 

http://www.ncbi.nlm.nih.gov/entrez/viewer.fcgi?db=protein&val=90101392

Neurotoxins
Ion channel toxins
Peptides
Scorpion toxins